is a former Japanese football player.

Club career
Kajiyama was born in Koto, Tokyo on 24 September 1985. He joined FC Tokyo from youth team in 2003. He is a skilful playmaker renowned for his passing and ball control, as well as his shooting with either foot. He debuted in 2003 and played many matches from 2004. FC Tokyo won the champions in 2004 J.League Cup first major title in the club history. He became a regular defensive midfielder in 2005 and played many matches every season. He was given "number 10" shirt in 2008. FC Tokyo won the champions in 2009 J.League Cup. However FC Tokyo finished at 16th place in 2010 season and was relegated to J2 League. In 2011, FC Tokyo won the champions and was returned to J1 in a year. FC Tokyo also won the champions in 2011 Emperor's Cup.

In 2013, Kajiyama was loaned to Super League Greece club Panathinaikos. In July, he returned to FC Tokyo. However he could not play at all in the match. In August, he was loaned to Oita Trinita. Although he played many matches, Trinita finished at the bottom place in 2013 season. In 2014, he returned to FC Tokyo. However his opportunity to play decreased year by year and he could hardly play in the match in 2018. In July 2018, he moved to J2 League club Albirex Niigata. He retired end of 2018 season.

National team career
In June 2005, Kajiyama was selected Japan U-20 national team for 2005 World Youth Championship. At this tournament, he played 3 matches as defensive midfielder with Yuzo Kobayashi. In August 2008, he was selected Japan U-23 national team for 2008 Summer Olympics. At this tournament, he wore the number 10 shirt for Japan and played all 3 matches as defensive midfielder.

Club statistics
Updated to 8 January 2019.

1Includes AFC Champions League and Suruga Bank Championship.

Honours
  FC Tokyo
J2 League (1) : 2011
Emperor's Cup (1) : 2011
J.League Cup (2) : 2004, 2009
Suruga Bank Championship (1) : 2010

References

External links

1985 births
Living people
Association football people from Tokyo
Japanese footballers
Japan youth international footballers
J1 League players
J2 League players
J3 League players
Super League Greece players
FC Tokyo players
FC Tokyo U-23 players
Panathinaikos F.C. players
Oita Trinita players
Albirex Niigata players
Olympic footballers of Japan
Footballers at the 2008 Summer Olympics
Japanese expatriate footballers
Japanese expatriate sportspeople in Greece
Expatriate footballers in Greece
Association football midfielders